Aimeric or Aimery de Peguilhan, Peguillan, or Pégulhan (c. 1170 – c. 1230) was a troubadour (fl. 1190–1221) born in Peguilhan (near Saint-Gaudens), the son of a cloth merchant.

Aimeric's first patron was Raimon V of Toulouse, followed by his son Raimon VI. However, he fled the region at the threat of the Albigensian Crusade and spent some time in Spain and ten years in Lombardy. It is said that he had secretly loved a neighbour while living in Toulouse, and that it was for her that he returned.

Aimeric is known to have composed at least fifty works, the music for six of which survives:

Most of his works were bland cansos with a few tensos (with Sordello and Albertet de Sestaro).

Notes

Sources
Gaunt, Simon, and Kay, Sarah (edd.) The Troubadours: An Introduction. Cambridge: Cambridge University Press, 1999. .

12th-century French troubadours
13th-century French troubadours
Occitan-language poets
1170s births
1230s deaths